Duesaigües is a village in the province of Tarragona and autonomous community of Catalonia, Spain.

References

External links
 Government data pages 

Municipalities in Baix Camp